Saint-Prest is a commune in the Eure-et-Loir department in northern France.

Population

Notable people
 Madeleine Castaing (1894–1992), antiques dealer and interior designer, spent her childhood at Villa des Roses, 30 rue de la République.

See also
Communes of the Eure-et-Loir department

References

Communes of Eure-et-Loir